Mike Pelton was the defensive line coach for the Georgia Tech Yellow Jackets football team. He previously served as the defensive line coach at Auburn University the past two seasons.

Sources
Auburn Tigers sports bio of Pelton

Year of birth missing (living people)
Living people
People from Pike County, Alabama
Players of American football from Alabama
American football defensive linemen
Auburn Tigers football players
Kansas City Chiefs players
Coaches of American football from Alabama
Troy Trojans football coaches
Valdosta State Blazers football coaches
Iowa State Cyclones football coaches
High school football coaches in Alabama
Vanderbilt Commodores football coaches
Auburn Tigers football coaches
Georgia Tech Yellow Jackets football coaches